Henry Cousens (1854–1933) was a Scottish archaeologist and photographer known for his pioneering work among the monuments and antiquities in British India, particularly in regions that are now Western India and Southern Pakistan. He was born in 1854 to Margaret Fitzmaurice and Henry Cousens Sr, in Renfrewshire, Scotland, UK. After his studies, he arrived in India and joined the Western division of the Archeological Survey of India in 1881. In 1891, he was promoted to the Superintendent post, where he served for nearly 20 years, retiring in 1910. He built a team of artists and draftsmen, visited remote archaeological and historic sites in impoverished regions with hardly any transport infrastructure. He surveyed the ruins and sites, documented and photographed caves, temples, and antiquarian remains of Buddhist, Hindu and Jaina monuments. He also surveyed medieval era ruins and sites belonging to Buddhism, Hinduism, Islam and Jainism.

Cousens meticulous measurements, sketches, photographs and reports were in many cases the earliest reports of historic sites in these parts of India and Pakistan. He thus published objective facts about India and Pakistan history, and brought them to the notice of wider scholarship within India, as well as Europe and the United States. He worked with James Burgess, a collaboration that produced a series of publications, cited throughout the 20th and 21st century. These were praised as of high quality, "beautiful photographs of temples and mosques", and important contributions by his peers, though some of the printing oversights and spelling errors were criticized.

According to  John Marshall, Cousens success at the Archeological department brought his team added responsibilities where the British India government sought to preserve the local heritage, its ancient monuments and further explore buried remains. Cousens effort helped clean up, restore and start this process of preserving India's heritage in Sindh, Gujarat, Maharashtra, Telangana, Andhra Pradesh and Karnataka. His publications include:
The Antiquities of the Town of Dabhoi in North Gujarat (with J. Burgess) 
Bijapur, a Guide to its Ruins
Notes on the Buildings and other Antiquarian Remains at Bijapur
Lists of Antiquarian Remains in HH. the Nizam’s Territories (now part of Andhra Pradesh and Telangana)
The Architectural Antiquities of Northern Gujarat (with J. Burgess)
Portfolio of Illustrations of Sindh Tiles 
Bijapur and its Architectural Remains
The Architectural Antiquities of Western India
The Chalukyan Architecture of the Kanarese Districts
The Antiquities of Sindh (now part of Pakistan)
Medieval Temples of the Dakhan
Somanatha and other Medieval Temples in Kathiawad

References

External links
Henry Cousens: A more extensive biography, Digital South Asia Library

1854 births
1933 deaths
Scottish archaeologists
Archaeological Survey of India people